This is a list of Macau billionaires based on an annual assessment of wealth and assets compiled and published by Forbes magazine in 2017.

2017 Macau billionaires list

See also 
 The World's Billionaires
 List of countries by the number of billionaires

References 

Lists of people by wealth
Net worth
 
Billionaires